The Cessna O-2 Skymaster (nicknamed "Oscar Deuce") is a military version of the Cessna 337 Super Skymaster, used for forward air control (FAC) and psychological operations (PSYOPS) by the US military between 1967 and 2010.

Design and development

In 1966, the United States Air Force (USAF) commissioned Cessna to build a military variant of the Skymaster to replace the Cessna O-1 Bird Dog.

Both the civilian and  military Skymasters were low-cost twin-engine piston-powered aircraft, with one engine in the nose of the aircraft and a second in the rear of the fuselage. The push-pull configuration provided centerline thrust, allowing simpler operation than the low-wing mounting of most twin-engine light aircraft, and allowed a high wing to be used, providing clear observation below and behind the aircraft.

Modifications made for the military configuration included fore-and-aft seating for a pilot and observer, instead of the six seats of the civilian version; installation of view panels in the doors (for improved ground observation); installation of flame-retardant foam in the wing-mounted fuel tanks (slightly increasing weight, and reducing maximum fuel capacity by 3%); installation of military, rather than civilian, communication and navigation equipment and antennas; removal of propeller spinners; increased gross weight (5,400 lb vs. 4,400 lb in civilian version), with component strengthening as required to support the increase; and removal of interior upholstery.

The first O-2 flew in January 1967, and the plane went into production shortly thereafter. Performance (especially at cruising altitudes) was degraded due to the added antennas and significant weight increase, but was considered sufficient for the anticipated low-level operation.

Operational history

United States

U.S. Air Force

The USAF took delivery of the O-2 Skymaster in March 1967 and the O-2A also entered the U.S. Army's inventory during 1967, from USAF stock. By 1970, a total of 532 O-2s had been built, in two variants, for the USAF.

During the Vietnam War, the O-2A was introduced as a replacement for the O-1 Bird Dog, in the forward air control (FAC) aircraft  and served in that role with the 20th Tactical Air Support Squadron. The O-2B was equipped with loudspeakers and a leaflet dispenser for use in the psychological operations (PSYOPS) role.

While it was intended that the Skymaster be replaced in the FAC mission by the OV-10 Bronco, the O-2A continued to be used for night missions after the OV-10's introduction, due to the OV-10's high level of cockpit illumination, rendering night reconnaissance impractical. The O-2 was phased out completely after additional night upgrades to the OV-10.

A total of 178 USAF O-2 Skymasters were lost in the Vietnam War, to all causes.

Following the Vietnam War, the O-2 continued to operate with both U.S. Air Force and Air National Guard units into the late 1980s.

U.S. Navy
Six former USAF O-2A airframes were transferred to the U.S. Navy in 1983 for use as range controllers with Attack Squadron 122 (VA-122), the Pacific Fleet Replacement Squadron for the A-7 Corsair II at Naval Air Station Lemoore, California. These aircraft were later transferred to Strike Fighter Squadron 125 (VFA-125), the F/A-18 Hornet FRS at NAS Lemoore, in 1986 for use in the same range control role.  These O-2A aircraft were eventually replaced by T-34C Turbomentor aircraft transferred from the Naval Air Training Command.

U.S. Army
Of the six USN aircraft mentioned above, two were transferred to the U.S. Army in late 1990. USAF O-2As were augmented by the 1990 aircraft transfer from the Navy. Several disassembled USAF O-2s remain in storage at Davis-Monthan AFB, Arizona. Two O-2As were used at Laguna Army Airfield, Arizona as part of testing programs carried out by the Yuma Proving Ground. These were retired in October 2010 and sent to a museum.

South Vietnam 
35 USAF O-2 aircraft were later transferred to and operated by the former Republic of Vietnam Air Force.

El Salvador
During the Salvadoran Civil War, the Salvadoran Air Force received a total of 23 O-2As and 2 O-2Bs from the United States, the first arriving in 1981. They were employed to observe the movements of FMLN formations and direct air strikes against them, playing a major role in forcing the rebel movement to abandon large-scale operations.

Near the end of the war in 1990, the rebels' acquisition of SA-7 missiles resulted in the loss of two O-2As, while another was destroyed by mortar fire, and two more were lost in crashes.

Civilian use

CAL FIRE
In the mid 1970s, the California Department of Forestry and Fire Protection, or CAL FIRE, found that the contractor-owned air attack aircraft, mostly single-engine Cessna 182s and Cessna 210s, did not provide the airspeed and safety needed for the department's new air tanker program. In 1974, Senior Air Operations Officer Cotton Mason inspected 40 USAF O-2s at Davis-Monthan Air Force Base. The best 20 were selected and shipped to Fresno, California. These aircraft had been FAC aircraft in Vietnam and were shipped back to the United States in containers, and were disassembled and on pallets when they arrived at Fresno. A crew of California Conservation Corps (CCC) members under the supervision of a CDF Battalion Chief, who was an FAA Certificated Mechanic with Inspection Authorization (IA), reassembled the aircraft.

They were placed in service in 1976, and served CAL FIRE for more than 20 years, until replaced by a fleet of OV-10 Broncos.

Variants

O-2A
Version designed for use in forward air control missions, with underwing ordnance hard points to hold rockets, gun pods or flares. 513 delivered.
O-2B
Version designed for psychological warfare, equipped with loudspeakers and a leaflet dispenser, and not armed. Thirty-one former civil 337s were converted to O-2Bs.

Operators

Botswana Air Force – Nine O-2A delivered 1993.

Civil Guard Air Section – Three O-2A.

Dominican Air Force – Five O-2A (retired)

National Armed Forces of Côte d'Ivoire – One O-2A delivered 1993.

Haitian Air Force – Eight (in service 1975–98) Reportedly six of these are Model 337s, and only two O-2As.

 Iran
Imperial Iranian Air Force – twelve O-2A delivered 1972.

Namibian Air Force – Six O-2A, five of which were delivered on June 26, 1994, for use in the anti-poaching and anti-smuggling role.

Salvadoran Air Force – 18 O-2A and two O-2B, delivered starting 1981. Eight O-2A and one O-2B remain in service.

Solomon Islands Government – Two O-2A.

Republic of Korea Air Force – at least 14 O-2A.

Republic of Vietnam Air Force – at least 35.

 Royal Thai Navy – 11 x  O2-337 Sentry 

United States Air Force – between 11 and 40 aircraft
United States Navy
United States Army

National Navy of Uruguay – Three O-2A acquired from Chile in June 2017.

Zimbabwe Air Force – Two O-2A delivered 1994–1995.

Aircraft on display

 O-2A, AF Ser. No. 67-21331, National Museum of the United States Air Force, Wright-Patterson Air Force Base, Ohio
 O-2A, AF Ser. No. 67-21368, Air Commando Park, Hurlburt Field, Florida
 O-2A, AF Ser. No. 67-21430, Fort Worth Aviation Museum, Fort Worth, Texas.
 O-2A, AF Ser. No. 68-10962, Main Gate, Shaw Air Force Base, South Carolina
 O-2A, AF Ser. No. 67-21331, c/n 337M-0037,  marked as 68-6864, c/n 337M-0153, Air Force Armament Museum, Eglin Air Force Base, Florida
 O-2A, AF Ser. No. 67-21376, 105th Airlift Wing area, Stewart Air National Guard Base, New York
 O-2A, AF Ser. No. 68-11164, USAF History and Traditions Museum, Lackland Air Force Base, Texas
 O-2A, AF Ser. No. 68-6865, Kelly Field Heritage Museum, Lackland Air Force Base/Kelly Field Annex (formerly Kelly Air Force Base), Texas
 O-2A, AF Ser. No. 67-21326, Dyess Linear Air Park, Dyess Air Force Base, Texas
 O-2A, AF Ser. No. 67-21395, Air Mobility Command Museum, Dover Air Force Base, Delaware
 O-2A, AF Ser. No. 68-10848, Jimmy Doolittle Air & Space Museum, Travis Air Force Base, Fairfield, California
 O-2A, AF Ser. No. 68-10853, Hill Aerospace Museum, Hill Air Force Base, Utah
 O-2A, AF Ser. No. 67-21380, Museum of Aviation, Robins Air Force Base, Georgia
 O-2A, AF Ser. No. 68-6871, Grissom Air Museum, Grissom Air Reserve Base (formerly Grissom Air Force Base), Indiana
 O-2A, AF Ser. No. 68-11160, 182nd Airlift Wing complex, Peoria Air National Guard Base, General Wayne A. Downing Peoria International Airport, Illinois
 O-2A, AF Ser. No. 68-6901, Pima Air and Space Museum (adjacent to Davis-Monthan Air Force Base), Tucson, Arizona
 O-2A, AF Ser. No. 67-21413, Castle Air Museum (former Castle Air Force Base), Atwater, California
 O-2A, AF Ser. No. 67-21411, in storage at Museum of Aviation, Robins Air Force Base, Warner Robins, Georgia.  Formerly on display at Octave Chanute Aerospace Museum, Rantoul, Illinois.<
 O-2A, AF Ser. No. 67-21330, Valiant Air Command Warbird Museum, Space Coast Regional Airport, Titusville, Florida
 O-2A, AF Ser. No. 67-21395, Evergreen Aviation Museum, McMinnville, Oregon
 O-2B, AF Ser. No. 67-21465, March Field Air Museum, March Air Reserve Base (formerly March Air Force Base), California
 O-2A, AF Ser. No. 69-7644, American Wings Air Museum, Anoka County Airport Jane's Field (KANE),  Blaine, Minnesota
 O-2A, AF Ser. No. 67-21416, Yankee Air Museum, Belleville, Michigan
In addition, several O-2s are privately operated as "warbirds".

Specifications (O-2)

See also

References

Bibliography

External links

O-2
High-wing aircraft
Twin-boom aircraft
Twin-engined push-pull aircraft
1960s United States military reconnaissance aircraft
Aircraft first flown in 1967